Hurtado de Mendoza may refer to:

 Andrés Hurtado de Mendoza, 3rd Marquis of Cañete (circa 1500-1561), Spanish military officer
 Antonio Hurtado de Mendoza (1586–1644), Spanish dramatist
 Diego Hurtado de Mendoza (multiple)
 García Hurtado de Mendoza, 5th Marquis of Cañete (1535–1609), Spanish soldier
 Jaime Enrique Hurtado de Mendoza (21st century), Mexican doctor and lawyer
 Pedro Hurtado de Mendoza (1578–1641), Jesuit scholastic thinker

 
Surnames
Spanish-language surnames